The 1932 Illinois gubernatorial election was held on November 8, 1932. Democratic nominee Henry Horner defeated Republican nominee and former Governor Len Small with 57.62% of the vote.

Incumbent first-term Republican Governor Louis Lincoln Emmerson did not run for re-election.

Primary elections
Primary elections were held on April 12, 1932.

Democratic primary

Candidates
Joseph L. Burke
Bruce A. Campbell, former State Representative
R. S. Douglas
Leo Patrick Dwyer
Oliver Wendell Holmes
Henry Horner, judge
Michael L. Igoe, member of the board of South Park Commissioners
Andrew W. Sullivan

Results

Republican primary

Candidates
Edward J. Brundage, former Attorney General of Illinois
Oscar E. Carlstrom, incumbent Attorney General of Illinois
Herbert E. Clayton
Omer N. Custer, former Treasurer of Illinois
J. Edward Jones
William H. Malone, former chairman of the Illinois Tax Commission
Willard A. Maxwell
Len Small, former Governor

Results

General election

Major candidates
Henry Horner, Democratic
Len Small, Republican

Minor candidates
Leondies McDonald, Communist
W. W. O'Brien, Independent
Roy E. Burt, Socialist, member of the board of education of the Methodist Episcopal Church
J. E. Procum, Socialist Labor, nominee for Governor in 1928

Results

See also
1932 Illinois lieutenant gubernatorial election

References

Bibliography
 

1932
Illinois
Gubernatorial
November 1932 events in the United States